In geometry, the trapezo-rhombic dodecahedron or rhombo-trapezoidal dodecahedron is a convex dodecahedron with 6 rhombic and 6 trapezoidal faces. It has  symmetry. A concave form can be constructed with an identical net, seen as excavating trigonal trapezohedra from the top and bottom.

Construction 

This polyhedron could be constructed by taking a tall uniform hexagonal prism, and making 3 angled cuts on the top and bottom. The trapezoids represent what remains of the original prism sides, and the 6 rhombi a result of the top and bottom cuts.

Space-filling tessellation 
A space-filling tessellation, the trapezo-rhombic dodecahedral honeycomb, can be made by translated copies of this cell. Each "layer" is a hexagonal tiling, or a rhombille tiling, and alternate layers are connected by shifting their centers and rotating each polyhedron so the rhombic faces match up.

:

In the special case that the long sides of the trapezoids equals twice the length of the short sides, the solid now represents the 3D Voronoi cell of a sphere in a hexagonal close packing, next to face-centered cubic an optimal way to stack spheres in a lattice. It is therefore similar to the rhombic dodecahedron, which can be represented by turning the lower half of the picture at right over an angle of 60 degrees. The rhombic dodecahedron is a Voronoi cell of the other optimal way to stack spheres.

As the Voronoi cell of a regular space pattern, it is a plesiohedron.
It is the polyhedral dual of the triangular orthobicupola.

Variations
The trapezo-rhombic dodecahedron can be seen as an elongation of another dodecahedron, which can be called a rhombo-triangular dodecahedron, with 6 rhombi (or squares) and 6 triangles. It also has d3h symmetry and is space-filling. It has 21 edges and 11 vertices. With square faces it can be seen as a cube split across the 3-fold axis, separated with the two halves rotated 180 degrees, and filling the gaps with triangles. When used as a space-filler, connecting dodecahedra on their triangles leaves two cubical step surfaces on the top and bottom which can connect with complementary steps.

See also 
 Elongated dodecahedron
 Hexagonal prismatic honeycomb

References
 
 Mathematical Recreations and Essays Walter William Rouse Ball, Harold Scott Macdonald Coxeter, p.151
 Structure in Nature Is a Strategy for Design, Peter Jon Pearce, p.48 Spacefilling systems based on rhombic dodecahedron

External links 
 
 VRML model 

Space-filling polyhedra